The 1962–63 season was Manchester City's 61st season of competitive football and 46th season in the top division of English football. In addition to the First Division, the club competed in the FA Cup and the Football League Cup.

First Division

League table

Results summary

References

External links

Manchester City F.C. seasons
Manchester City